Maciej Staręga (born 31 January 1990, in Siedlce) is a Polish cross-country skier. He competed at the FIS Nordic World Ski Championships 2013 in Val di Fiemme, the 2014 Winter Olympics in Sochi, in 15 kilometre classical and 4 × 10 kilometre relay and the 2018 Winter Olympics in Pyeongchang.

He married Polish biathlete Monika Hojnisz in June 2019.

Cross-country skiing results
All results are sourced from the International Ski Federation (FIS).

Olympic Games

Distance reduced to 30 km due to weather conditions.

World Championships

World Cup

Season standings

References

External links

1990 births
Living people
Cross-country skiers at the 2014 Winter Olympics
Cross-country skiers at the 2018 Winter Olympics
Cross-country skiers at the 2022 Winter Olympics
Polish male cross-country skiers
Olympic cross-country skiers of Poland
Place of birth missing (living people)
People from Siedlce
Competitors at the 2015 Winter Universiade